The Beijing International Street Circuit was a clockwise street circuit located at the Shunyi Olympic Rowing-Canoeing Park, in Beijing, China.

History
To keep the success of Olympic Games, the Shunyi District decided to invest 300 million yuan to build facilities for motorsport.
The circuit opened in October 2010, when it hosted a non-championship round of the 2010 Superleague Formula season.

References

External links 
Superleague Formula 2010 Beijing Stop (piao.com.cn)

Motorsport venues in Beijing
Sports venues in Beijing